Johnson Akuamoah Asiedu is a Ghanaian accountant who currently serves as Auditor-General of Ghana. He was appointed by Nana Akufo-Addo in 2021 to replace Daniel Yaw Domelevo.

Education 
Asiedu holds an Bachelor of Science degree in Business Administration (Accounting) from the University of Ghana, Legon. He also holds an Masters in Business Administration in Strategic Management from the Paris Graduate School of Management. He is a chartered accountant and is a member of the Institute of Chartered Accountants (Ghana) and the Institute of Internal Auditors.

Career

Auditor-General of Ghana 
In July 2020, Aseidu assumed the position of acting Auditor-General of Ghana after his boss Daniel Yaw Domelevo was asked to go on accumulated leave of 167 working days. He continued in that role also from March 2021 following a controversial retirement of Domelevo till his elevation to Auditor-General of Ghana. In September 2021, Asiedu was appointed by President Nana Akufo-Addo to serve as Auditor-General of Ghana with effect from 27 August 2021.

Personal life 
Asiedu is a Christian and enjoys preaching the gospel.

See also 

 Auditor-General of Ghana

References 

Living people
Ghanaian accountants
Ghanaian civil servants
Auditor-General of Ghana
Year of birth missing (living people)